Gustav Mann (1836–1916) was a German botanist who led expeditions in West Africa and was also a gardener at the Royal Botanic Gardens, Kew.

Born in Hanover in 1836, he was chosen by William Jackson Hooker, Director of the Royal Botanic Gardens, Kew, to take part in William Balfour Baikie's expedition to West Africa.  While there, he sent numerous specimens back to Kew.

He married Mary Anne Stovell in 1863.

Mann's exploration of the Cameroon mountains is described by Sir Richard Burton in Abeokuta and the Camaroon Mountains vol. 2 

Mann later collected specimens in Darjeeling, India, before retiring to Munich, Germany, in 1891. He died in 1916.

Some 349 species of plants, the genera Manniella Hook.f. and Manniophyton Muell. Arg.; and Mann's Spring on the Cameroon Mountain bear his name.

Publications

Mann, G., H. Wendland, Hooker, Sir J. D. On the palms of western tropical Africa.  R. Taylor, 1864, London.
	
Mann, G. List of Assam ferns. C. Wolf & Sohn, 1898?, München

Mann, G. "Physiological Histology, Methods and Theory". Clarendon Press, 1902, Oxford

For more information:

References

19th-century German botanists
Botanists active in Kew Gardens
Botanists active in Africa
1836 births
1916 deaths